Heidi Ann Horton (née Burge; November 11, 1971) is a former American professional women's basketball player. She is the twin sister of Heather (Burge) Quella.

Early life
As a 5-month-old in 1972, Heidi Burge was found to have a second aorta wrapped around and constricting her windpipe which needed to be removed through open-heart surgery. At the time, she was given only a 50-50 chance of survival.

Prior to starting high school, the Burge family moved to Palos Verdes Estates, California so that the sisters could attend Palos Verdes High School. Although Burge was not originally interested in playing basketball, as she preferred theater and volleyball, after being asked to try out by the ladies basketball coach her freshman year, she quickly fell in love with the game. Burge brought success to the team, transforming the Sea Kings into Southern Section 3-A champions in 1987 and concluding her high-school career second on the school's all-time list of girls' scorers with 1,183 points.

After graduation, both sisters accepted scholarships to attend the University of Virginia and play for the Lady Cavaliers basketball team. Although the pair would attend the same school, they did not live together or even have the same circle of friends. The Burges also did not play the same position on the court, as Heidi preferred the outside game and Heather (who is 6 minutes older) played inside against the opposing team's center and was the go-to scorer in the paint.

Basketball star
UVA won right away, with Burge averaging 8.3 points and 6.3 rebounds a game her freshman year, and the pair playing a big part in leading the team to the school's first three, and to date only, Atlantic Coast Conference championships (in 1990, 1992 and 1993) and Women's NCAA Final Four appearances (1990–1992). Following the school year in 1989 and 1990, Burge was asked to play for USA Basketball U18 and U19 basketball teams and won a gold medal at the 1990 US Olympic Festival.

Things did not always go smoothly for the Burges in their freshman and sophomore seasons, as the pair were frequently in foul trouble, rarely played at the same time on the court (due to their foul situation), fought with teammates and each other, and were considered by their teammates to be both "soft" and prone to mistakes and turnovers.

However, during their time with UVA, the pair averaged 24 points and seven rebounds per game and teamed with NCAA All-Americans Dawn Staley and Tammi Reiss to lead the Cavaliers to three consecutive Final Fours and a 1991 overtime loss to Tennessee in the championship game. In all three trips to the Final Four, the Cavaliers lost to the eventual NCAA Champion (losing to Stanford in 1990 and 1992). Virginia's 1992 campaign ended with a school-record 32 wins (32-2, 15–1 in the ACC), and the team was ranked #1 in the Associated Press Poll and second in the USA Today Coaches Poll at the end of the regular season. Prior to her senior year in 1993, Burge was among only 54 UVA incoming seniors given the privilege of living in one of the residences in The Lawn, a portion of the campus that makes up much of the original buildings constructed on campus in 1817–19. Also in 1993, Virginia lost in the East Region Championship to NCAA runner-up Ohio State. The Lady Cavs lost all four tournament games by a total of only 15 points, with the biggest score differential being their 9-point loss to Stanford in 1990.

While at UVA, Burge was a three-year member of the ACC Academic Honor Roll (1991–1993). As of May 2011, Burge was tied for third in career games played with 134, sixth in rebounds with 853 boards, sixth in blocked shots with 108 blocks, twelfth in career double-doubles with 14, and 21st in career scoring, with 1,191 points.

After graduating with a bachelor's degree with a dual major in Rhetoric and Communications Studies and Spanish, Burge played professionally for six years overseas with AS Montferrand in France (1993–94), GYSEV-Sopron in Hungary (1994–95), Cariparma in Italy (1995–96), and finally  Panathinaikos in Athens, Greece (1996–1997).

Following her season in Greece, Burge accepted an offer to play in the newly formed Women's National Basketball Association (WNBA) for the Los Angeles Sparks alongside four-time Olympic gold medal winner Lisa Leslie. Although the team led the league in scoring (with 74 points per game) and were fourth (out of eight teams) in defensive rating, the Sparks finished a disappointing 14-14 and out of the playoff picture. On January 27, 1998, Burge was taken by the Washington Mystics as their first selection and second selection overall in the expansion draft that formed the nucleus of both the Mystics and the Detroit Shock. Burge was featured as one of the key Mystics players prior to the start of the season and included in team marketing. During the season, Burge would start half the team's 30 games, finish second on the team in both field goal and three point percentages and fourth in minutes, points, rebounds, and blocked shots, but it wouldn't be enough, as the team would finish a league-worst 3-27 despite the presence of Olympian Nikki McCray. Her stay with the Mystics was short as well, as Burge was released on June 9, 1999 by the team following her injury-plagued 1998 season (in which she struggled with a lower back injury and a broken finger) and after drafting all-star forward Chamique Holdsclaw.

Among the highlights of her WNBA career was a game-high 11 rebounds and nine points against the Phoenix Mercury in 1997, a 14-point, 9 rebound effort in a 75–68 victory over the Utah Starzz the same year, and a career-high 19 points against the Mercury in August 1998. Upon retirement, one of Burge's biggest professional disappointments was that she was never able to play with or against Heather.

USA Basketball

Burge was named to the USA team for the 1993 World University Games competition in Buffalo, New York. The team had a 6–2 record and won the bronze medal. Burge averaged 4.4 points per game.

Post-retirement
After leaving basketball in January 2000, Burge moved to Houston, Texas after accepting a job as a press and media broadcasting intern for the WNBA's Houston Comets. She now lives with her husband, Patrick Horton, whom she married on September 29, 2001, and has two children, Jonathan (born 2003) and Holly (born 2005). Burge works as a physical therapist specializing in lower back injuries (which was inspired by her own career-ending lower back injury) and as a youth basketball instructor at various Houston-area camps including Post University and Basketball Hoops School. She also works as a private coach.

At 6 feet 5 inches each, the Burges sisters were recognized in 1991 by Guinness World Records as the world's tallest female twins. This record was broken in 2004 by Ann and Claire Recht. The Disney television movie Double Teamed, which was released in 2002, is based on their life stories and achievements in high school basketball. In the movie, Burge is played by Annie McElwain.

WNBA career statistics

See also
 List of twins
 List of University of Virginia people

References

External links 
 Gball Online: Talent Times Two

1971 births
Living people
American women's basketball players
American expatriate basketball people in France
American expatriate basketball people in Greece
American expatriate basketball people in Hungary
American expatriate basketball people in Italy
American expatriate basketball people in Luxembourg
Basketball players from California
Centers (basketball)
Identical twins
Los Angeles Sparks players
People from Marin County, California
Power forwards (basketball)
American twins
Twin sportspeople
Virginia Cavaliers women's basketball players
Washington Mystics players
People from Palos Verdes Estates, California
United States women's national basketball team players